The Kutchi people (Kutchi and Gujarati: ڪڇّی; કચ્છી) traditionally hail from the Kutch district of the western Indian state of Gujarat and the Sindh region of Pakistan.

History
Some of the Kutchi people of India converted from Hinduism to Islam in the 15th century A.D., largely through the efforts of Saiyid Abdullah. The Kutchi Memons were encouraged to spread throughout India, though many remained in Kutch.

Kutchis, being a part of the Indian diaspora, have maintained their traditions abroad; in 1928, Kutchi Hindus in Nairobi held a Swaminarayan procession in which 1200 people attended.

Notable Kutchi people

 Shyamji Krishna Varma, revolutionary, lawyer, and journalist
Abdullah Hussain Haroon, Former Permanent Representative of Pakistan to the United Nations
 Abdul Qadir Patel, Pakistani Politician and  Pakistan Peoples Party Parliamentarians  Member National Assembly of Pakistan from NA-248 (Karachi West-I).
 Azim Premji, industrialist
 El-Farouk Khaki
 Fahmida Mirza, first female Speaker of the National Assembly of Pakistan
 Faisal Devji
 Gulgee, Pakistani artist
 Hussain Shah, Pakistani boxer  
 Harish Bhimani, Indian voiceover artist
 Ian Iqbal Rashid
 Janvi Chheda, Actress, director, and model
 John Nuraney, Canadian politician
 Anandji Virji Shah, Bollywood music director 
 Kalyanji Virji Shah, Bollywood music director
 Laxmichand "Babla" Virji Shah, musician and percussionist
 Naheed Nenshi, 36th mayor of Calgary
 Omar Sachedina, CTV Broadcaster
 Salim Merchant
 Shafique Virani
 Shekhar Ravjiani from the music duo Vishal–Shekhar
 Sulaiman Merchant
 Viju Shah, music director
 Vipul Amrutlal Shah, Bollywood director producer

See also
 Kutch State
 Cutch State
 Cutch Agency

References

External links
 
 Suvichar Ki Dayri

 
Indo-Aryan peoples
People from Gujarat
Hindu ethnic groups
Muslim communities of India
Kutch district
Culture of Kutch